Syed Mohamed bin Syed Ahmad Alsagoff (1836 – 1906) was an Hadhrami Muslim born in Singapore who was known as Nong Chik. 

He was the most prominent member of the family. He received two land concessions from Sultan Abu Bakar of Johor; one in Kukup where he could print his own currency and the other in Kampong Nong Chik.

He was also involved in Singapore's civil service undertaking several diplomatic posts. The first post he held was the Ottoman consul, where the Osmanieh Order inducted him into their ranks after he became consul. Syed Mohamed was also asked to conduct diplomacy on behalf of the Sultanate of Aceh during its conflict with the Dutch.

He died on July 3, 1906. After his death, his sons developed the Bukit Tunggal Estate in the 1920s. The Madrasah Alsagoff Al-Arabiah (founded in 1912) was built according to his will.

See also
 Arab Singaporeans
 Alsagoff Family
 Sayyid

References

Malaysian Muslims
Malaysian people of Yemeni descent
Singaporean people of Yemeni descent
Malaysian military personnel
Victoria School, Singapore alumni
Hadhrami people